Freydis Sharland (22 September 1920 – 24 May 2014), known as Freydis Leaf for most of her career, was a pioneering woman pilot and one of the first women to get RAF wings.

Early life 
Freydis Leaf was born in Cambridge to Catherine (Kay-Shuttleworth, her father was Ughtred Kay-Shuttleworth of Gawthorpe Hall) and Charles Leaf. She was the middle child of three: two boys and a girl.  Her father was a meteorologist and archaeologist who served in both the First World War, as an Army officer, and the Second World War, as an officer of the Royal Marines; he was, in the meantime, also an Olympic gold-medallist.

She was educated at Ancaster Gate school, Bexhill, East Sussex, then Wycombe Abbey school, Buckinghamshire.

War-service 
When her father and brother Derek started to learn to fly in 1937, Freydis insisted on the same opportunity: they all learned to fly at the Marshall flying school in Cambridge. When the war began, Leaf volunteered as a nurse in the Red Cross in Colchester, Essex while trying to get into the ATA for over a year. She went on to work with the Aeronautical Inspection Directorate.

In 1943 she joined the Air Transport Auxiliary (ATA) and began her career as a pilot. Starting with 26 hours and 10 minutes flying time, she was based in Hamble, Hampshire. She also served in the Ferry Pools (FP) in Sherburn-in-Elmet in Yorkshire, Prestwick in Scotland and White Waltham, in Berkshire. As an ATA pilot, Leaf learned to fly a wide range of planes from the Vickers Wellington and the Lockheed Hudson to the De Havilland Mosquito and Spitfire. By the end of the war she had 607 hours and 25 minutes  flying time accumulated. Her distinguished brother, Lt. Derek Leaf, DSC & bar, RNVR, and BA.(Cantab.), was killed in action in 1944.

Post-war 
The ATA was disbanded at the end of 1945 and Leaf then worked as a freelance commercial pilot, gaining her commercial licence in November 1946. In 1953, as a commercial pilot, Leaf flew a Hawker Tempest V on a 4,000-mile flight from the base in England to a base in Karachi. When she arrived, after stops in Nicosia, Baghdad and Bahrain she was not allowed to use the Officers mess because she was a woman.

In 1949 she was commissioned into the Women's RAF Volunteer Reserve (WRAFVR), as a Pilot Officer; she later earned a promotion to Flying Officer. During her 5-year commission, she also became one of the first women to qualify as an RAF pilot.

In 1954 Leaf became the British Air-Racing Champion and, in the following year, she founded the British Women Pilots' Association. She was also a leading figure in the Women's Junior Air Corps and the Girls Venture Corps.

Personal life 
On the Edinburgh Castle liner to South Africa with her mother to visit her brother, Leaf met Tim Sharland, a former British Army officer. They married shortly after, on New Year's Eve and worked both in Africa and Britain. They had three children, two daughters and a son. Freydis Sharland stopped flying for several years while her children were young but took it up again when her youngest was 17. After she retired from training young women pilots with the Girl's Venture Corps she began flying microlights until the end of the 20th century. She died 24 May 2014.

First five
Jean Bird, Benedetta Willis, Jackie Moggridge, Freydis Leaf and Joan Hughes were the first five women to qualify as pilots of the RAF. All qualified in the early 1950s, as officers of WRAFVR, and were awarded the standard 'Wings' of an RAF pilot. There was a gap of nearly four decades until the next woman, Julie Ann Gibson, a regular officer of the WRAF, qualified in 1991.

References

Sources
 
 * 
 
 
 
 
 

British aviators
1920 births
2014 deaths
British women aviators
Air Transport Auxiliary pilots
British women in World War II